Dr. William Columbus Cauthen House, also known as Oak View Farm, is a historic home located near Kershaw, Lancaster County, South Carolina. It was built about 1848, and is a two-story, frame, weatherboarded, central-hall farmhouse, or I-house.  Also on the property are a log barn and a frame barn and shed.  It is the oldest known residence in Lancaster County and was the home of Dr. William Columbus Cauthen, who was involved in state politics.

It was added to the National Register of Historic Places in 1982.

References

Houses on the National Register of Historic Places in South Carolina
Houses completed in 1848
Houses in Lancaster County, South Carolina
National Register of Historic Places in Lancaster County, South Carolina